Transnationalism is a research field and social phenomenon grown out of the heightened interconnectivity between people and the receding economic and social significance of boundaries among nation states.

Overview
The term "trans-national" was popularized in the early 20th century by writer Randolph Bourne to describe a new way of thinking about relationships between cultures. However, the term itself was coined by a colleague in college. Merriam-Webster Dictionary states 1921 was the year the term "transnational" was first used in print, which was after Bourne's death.

Transnationalism as an economic process involves the global reorganization of the production process, in which various stages of the production of any product can occur in various countries, typically with the aim of minimizing costs.  Economic transnationalism, commonly known as globalization, was spurred in the latter half of the 20th century by the development of the internet and wireless communication, as well as the reduction in global transportation costs caused by containerization.  Multinational corporations could be seen as a form of transnationalism, in that they seek to minimize costs, and hence maximize profits, by organizing their operations in the most efficient means possible irrespective of political boundaries.

Proponents of transnational capitalism seek to facilitate the flow of people, ideas, and goods among regions. They believe that it has increasing relevance with the rapid growth of capitalist globalization. They contend that it does not make sense to link specific nation-state boundaries with for instance migratory workforces, globalized corporations, global money flow, global information flow, and global scientific cooperation. However, critical theories of transnationalism have argued that transnational capitalism has occurred through the increasing monopolization and centralization of capital by leading dominant groups in the global economy and various power blocs.  Scholars critical of global capitalism (and its global ecological and inequality crises) have argued instead for a transnationalism from below between workers and co-operatives as well as popular social and political movements.

Transnationalism as concept, theory and experience has nourished an important literature in social sciences. In practice transnationalism refers to increasing functional integration of processes that cross-borders or according to others trans bordered relations of individuals, groups, firms and to mobilizations beyond state boundaries. Individuals, groups, institutions and states interact with each other in a new global space where cultural and political characteristic of national societies are combined with emerging multilevel and multinational activities. Transnationalism is a part of the process of capitalist globalization. The concept of transnationalism refers to multiple links and interactions linking people and institutions across the borders of nation-states. Although much of the more recent literature has focused on popular protest as a form of transnational activism, some research has also drawn attention to clandestine and criminal networks, as well as foreign fighters, as examples of a wider form of transnationalism.

Some have argued that diasporas, such as the overseas Chinese, are a historical precursor to modern transnationalism. However, unlike some people with transnationalist lives, most diasporas have not been voluntary. The field of diaspora politics does consider modern diasporas as having the potential to be transnational political actors and be influenced by transnational political forces. While the term "transnationalism" emphasizes the ways in which nations are no longer able to contain or control the disputes and negotiations through which social groups annex a global dimension to their meaningful practices, the notion of diaspora brings to the fore the racial dynamics underlying  the international division of labor and the economic turmoil of global capital. In an article published in 2006, Asale Angel-Ajani claimed that "there is the possibility within diaspora studies to move away from the politically sanitized discourse that surrounds transnational studies". Since African diaspora studies have focused on racial formation, racism, and white supremacy, diaspora theory has the potential to bring to transnationalism "a varied political, if not radical political, perspective to the study of transnational processes and—globalization".

Causes 

Different approaches have attempted to explain transnationalism. Some argue that it is driven mainly by the development of technologies that have made transportation and communication more accessible and affordable, which thus dramatically change the relationship between people and places. It is now possible for immigrants to maintain closer and more frequent contact with their home societies than ever before.

However, the integration of international migrations to the demographic future of many developed countries is another important driver for transnationalism. Beyond simply filling a demand for low-wage workers, migration also fills the demographic gaps created by declining natural populations in most industrialized countries. Today, migration accounts for three fifths of population growth on western countries as a whole, a trend that shows no signs of slowing down.

Moreover, global political transformations and new international legal regimes have weakened the state as the only legitimate source of rights. Decolonization, the fall of communism, and the ascendance of human rights have forced states to take account of persons as persons, rather than as citizens. As a result, individuals have rights regardless of their citizenship status within a country.

Others, from a neo-Marxist approach, argue that transnational class relations have come about concomitantly with novel organizational and technological advancements and the spread of transnational chains of production and finance.

Immigrant transnational activities 

When immigrants engage in transnational activities, they create "social fields" that link their original country with their new country or countries of residence. "We have defined transnationalism as the process by which immigrants build social fields that link together their country of origin and their country of settlement". These social fields are the product of a series of interconnected and overlapping economic, political, and socio-cultural activities:

Economic transnational activities 
Economic transnational activities such as business investments in home countries and monetary remittances are both pervasive and well documented. The Inter-American Development Bank (IDB) estimates that in 2006 immigrants living in developed countries sent home the equivalent of $300 billion in remittances, an amount more than double the level of international aid. This intense influx of resources may mean that for some nations development prospects become inextricably linked—if not dependent upon—the economic activities of their respective diasporas.

Political transnational activities 
Political transnational activities can range from retained membership in political parties in one's country of origin and voting in its elections to even running for political office. Less formal but still significant roles include the transfer or dissemination of political ideas and norms, such as publishing an op-ed in a home country newspaper, writing a blog, or lobbying a local elected official. There is also the more extreme example of individuals such as Jesus Galvis, a travel agent in New Jersey who in 1997 ran for a Senate seat in his native Colombia. He was elected and intended to hold office simultaneously in Bogota and Hackensack, New Jersey where he served as a city councilor.

Political economy 
The rise of global capitalism has occurred through a novel and increasingly functional integration of capitalist chains of production and finance across borders which is tied to the formation of a transnational capitalist class. This approach has led to a broader study of corporate networks, the global working class and the transnationalization of state apparatuses and elites.

Psychology 
Transnational psychology developed in response to the new psychological contexts created by escalating globalization, global power dynamics, increasing migration, an ever more interconnected world, and other phenomena that transcend nation-state boundaries. It is a branch of psychology that applies postcolonial, postmodern context-sensitive cultural psychology, and transnational feminist lenses to the field of psychology to study, understand, and address the impact of colonization, imperialism, and globalization, and to counter the Western bias in the field of psychology. Transnational psychologists partner with members of local communities to examine the unique psychological characteristics of groups without regard to nation-state boundaries.

Socio-cultural transnational activities 
Transnationalism is an analytic lens used to understand immigrant and minority populations as a meeting of multiple simultaneous histories. Socio-cultural transnational activities cover a wide array of social and cultural transactions through which ideas and meanings are exchanged. Recent research has established the concept and importance of social remittances which provide a distinct form of social capital between migrants living abroad and those who remain at home. These transfers of socio-cultural meanings and practices occur either during the increased number of visits that immigrants take back to their home countries or visits made by non-migrants to friends and families living in the receiving countries or through the dramatically increased forms of correspondence such as emails, online chat sessions, telephone calls, CDs/ VDOs, and traditional letters.

In the late 1980s, ethnic studies scholars would largely move towards models of diaspora to understand immigrant communities in relation to area studies, although lone patterns of international flow would become accompanied by the multiple flows of transnationalism. However, to say that immigrants build social fields that link those abroad with those back home is not to say that their lives are not firmly rooted in a particular place and time. Indeed, they are as much residents of their new community as anyone else.

Transnationalism is criticized for being too far removed from ethnic studies' efforts to empower solidarity in minority communities. Asian American Studies provides a counterargument in that its inception was based in comparative analysis of the racial discrimination against Asian Americans and Vietnamese during the Vietnam War. A collection of scholarly articles, edited by Terese Guinsatao Monberg and Morris Young, seeks to understand how transnationalism reveals ways Asian/Americans "negotiate, resist, and work against emerging, shifting, and often intensified 'highly asymmetrical relations of power.'" Furthermore,  inter-movement spillover plays an important role in transnational climate change politics.
Based on these findings, one can conclude that when movements come together in the form of actors and social change tactics, movements become stronger and more prominent. This is the purpose and overall effect of inter-movement spillover.

Migration 

Transnationalism has significant implications for the way we conceptualize immigration. Traditionally, immigration has been seen as an autonomous process, driven by conditions such as poverty and overpopulation in the country of origin and unrelated to conditions (such as foreign policy and economic needs) in the receiving country. Even though overpopulation, economic stagnation, and poverty all continue to create pressures for migration, they alone are not enough to produce large international migration flows. There are many countries, for example, which lack significant emigration history despite longstanding poverty. Also, most international immigration flows from the global South to the global North are not made up by the poorest of the poor, but, generally by professionals. In addition, there are countries with high levels of job creation that continue to witness emigration on a large scale.

The reasons and promoters for migration are not only embodied within the country of origin. Instead, they are rooted within the broader geopolitical and global dynamics. Significant evidence of geographic migration patterns suggests that receiving countries become home to immigrants from the receiving country's zone of influence. Then, immigration is but a fundamental component of the process of capitalist expansion, market penetration, and globalization. There are systematic and structural relations between globalization and immigration.

The emergence of a global economy has contributed both to the creation of potential emigrants abroad and to the formation of economic, cultural, and ideological links between industrialized and developing countries that later serve as bridges for the international migration. For example, the same set of circumstances and processes that have promoted the location of factories and offices abroad have also contributed to the creation of large supply of low-wage jobs for which immigrant workers constitute a desirable labor supply. Moreover, the decline of manufacturing jobs and the growth of the service sector, key drivers of the globalization of production, have transformed western economies’ occupational and income structure.

Unlike the manufacturing sector, which traditionally supplied middle-income jobs and competitive benefits, the majority of service jobs are either extremely well-paid or extremely poorly paid, with relatively few jobs in the middle-income range. Many of the jobs lack key benefits such as health insurance. Sales representatives, restaurant wait staff, administrative assistants, and custodial workers are among the growth occupations.

Finally, the fact that the major growth sectors rather than declining sectors are generating the most low-wage jobs shows that the supply of such jobs will continue to increase for the predictable future. The entry of migrant workers will similarly continue to meet the demand. In turn, this inflow provides the raw material out of which transnational communities emerge.

List of transnational organizations
Transnational organizations include:
 Médecins Sans Frontières
 National Alliance of Latin American and Caribbean Communities
 Roman Catholic Church
 No Border network

See also

 Anarchism
 Anti-globalization
 Citizenship
 Communitarian
 Cosmopolitanism
 Diaspora politics
 Global citizenship
 Globalization
 Internationalism (politics)
 Mercenary
 Multinational corporations
 Nation-states
 Nationalism
 Perpetual traveler
 Postnationalism
 Transnational cinema
 Transnational organization
 Transnational progressivism
 Transnationality
 Transnationality Index

References

Works cited

Further reading
 Appadurai, Arjun: Modernity at Large: Cultural Dimensions of Globalization, Delhi, India, Oxford University Press, 1997 - is critical of the construct of the nation-state and seek to propagate a greater use of transnational thought.
 Bachmann-Medick, Doris, ed.: The Trans/National Study of Culture: A Translational Perspective, Berlin, Boston: de Gruyter, 2014 (paperback edition 2016).
 Barkan, Elliott Robert, ed.: Immigration, Incorporation and Transnationalism, Somerset, New Jersey, USA, Transaction Publishers, 2003.
 Bourne, Randolph: "Trans-National America" in The Atlantic Monthly, #118 (July 1916), pp. 86–97, Boston, The Atlantic Monthly Group, 1916.

 
 Faist, Thomas, The Volume and Dynamics of International Migration and Transnational Social Spaces. Oxford: Oxford University Press, 2000.
 Green, Nancy L. "The Trials of Transnationalism: It’s Not as Easy as It Looks." Journal of Modern History 89.4 (2017): 851–874.
 
 Guarnizo, Luis Eduardo & Michael Peter Smith, eds., Transnationalism from Below, New Brunswick, New Jersey, USA, Transaction Publishers, 1997.
 Iriye, Akira. Global and Transnational History: The Past, Present, and Future. London: Palgrave MacMillan UK, 2013.
 Joerges, Christian; Inger-Johanne Sand & Gunther Teubner, eds.: Transnational governance and constitutionalism, Oxford, United Kingdom, Hart Publishing, 2004.
 Keohane, Robert O. & Joseph S. Nye, eds. Transnational relations and world politics, Cambridge, Massachusetts, USA, Harvard University Press, 1972 - a classic work about the distinction in international relations.
 Kyle, David. "Transnational Peasants: Migrations, Ethnicity, and Networks in Andean Ecuador," Baltimore, Johns Hopkins University Press, 2000.-developed the concept of transnational "migration merchants."
 McAlister, Elizabeth.  1998.  "The Madonna of 115th St. Revisited:  Vodou and Haitian Catholicism in the Age of Transnationalism."  In S. Warner, ed., Gatherings in Diaspora.  Philadelphia:  Temple Univ. Press.
 McKeown, Adam: Chinese Migrant Networks and Cultural Change: Peru, Chicago, and Hawaii 1900-1936, Chicago, Illinois, USA, The University of Chicago Press, 2001 - offered a transnational look at Chinese immigrants and social links in the nineteenth century.
Moreno Tejada, Jaime, "Introduction: Distance - Modern Transnational Frontiers" in Transnational Frontiers of Asia and Latin America since 1800. London: Routledge, 2016.
Ong, Aihwa. Flexible Citizenship: The Cultural Logic of Transnationality. Duke University Press: Durham, 1999.
 Pries, Ludger, ed.: Migration and Transnational Social Spaces, Aldershot, United Kingdom, Ashgate, 1999.
 Rees, Martha, ed.: Special Issue: Costs of Transnational Migration, in Migration Letters, Vol. 6, No. 1, October 2009.
 Robinson, William I.: "Beyond Nation-State Paradigms: Globalization, Sociology, and the Challenge of Transnational Studies" in Sociological Forum, Vol. 13, No 4, pp. 561–594, New York City, USA, 1998.
 Sassen, Saskia: Cities in a World Economy, Thousand Oaks, California, USA, Pine Forge Press, 2006 - more detailed analysis of the transnational phenomenon, with elaborate examples, is contained in the writings of Saskia Sassen.
 Shaffer, Gregory C. ed. 2012. Transnational Legal Ordering and State Change. Cambridge University Press.
 Tarrow, Sidney: The new transnational activism, New York City, USA, Cambridge University Press, 2005.

External links
 See the "Network for Critical Study of Global Capitalism" http://netglobalcapitalism.wordpress.com
 See the trilingual (English, Chinese, French) Transtext(e)sTranscultures: Journal of Global Cultural Studies http://www.transtexts.net publication of the Institute for Transtextual and Transculural Studies, University of Lyon, France.
 See the University of the Arts London Research Centre for Transnational Art, Identity & Nation http://www.transnational.org.uk

 
Nationalism
1920s neologisms
World government
Globalization